The 2019 Women's Cricket Super League, or 2019 Kia Super League for sponsorship reasons, was the fourth and final season of the Women's Cricket Super League (WCSL), the semi-professional women's cricket competition in England and Wales. The competition, run by the England and Wales Cricket Board (ECB), consisted of six franchise teams playing in a Twenty20 format. The tournament was scheduled to be replaced by the Women's Hundred and a new regional domestic structure from the next season, although the full implementation of this was delayed due to the COVID-19 pandemic. Surrey Stars were the defending champions. Western Storm defeated Southern Vipers by 6 wickets to win the 2019 title.

Competition format
Six teams competed for the T20 title from 6 August to 1 September 2019. The six teams played each other twice in a round robin format. The 2nd and 3rd team played the semi-final while the top team directly went to the final. Both semi-final and final were held on Finals Day at the County Ground, Hove. Teams received 4 points for a win and a bonus point if their run rate was 1.25 times that of their opposition.

Teams

Points Table

 advanced to Final
 advanced to the Semi-final

 Win with bonus point: 5 points
 Win without bonus point: 4 points
 No Result/Tied: 2 points each 
 Loss: 0 points

Fixtures

League stage

Semi-final

Final

Statistics 
 Highest score by a team: Yorkshire Diamonds − 185/6 (20 overs) v Southern Vipers (25 August).
 Lowest score by a team: Surrey Stars − 89 (16.4 overs) v Southern Vipers (18 August).
 Top score by an individual: Jemimah Rodrigues − 112* (58) v Southern Vipers (25 August).
 Best bowling figures by an individual: Leigh Kasperek − 4/16 (4 overs) v Southern Vipers (21 August).

Most runs

Source: ESPNCricinfo

Most wickets

Source: ESPNCricinfo

References

External links
 Tournament homepage at ESPNcricinfo
 Tournament homepage at CricBuzz

2019
2019 in English women's cricket